Leonard Asper (born May 31, 1964) is a Canadian businessperson, entrepreneur and lawyer. He is a graduate of Brandeis University and the University of Toronto Law School, and is a member of the Ontario Bar Association and The Law Society of Upper Canada.

Biography
Leonard Asper is the son of the late Izzy Asper, founder of CanWest Global Communications Corp. He is the younger brother of Gail Asper and David Asper. He is currently the CEO of Anthem Sports & Entertainment Corp.

Asper has over 20 years of broadcast and media experience, including 10 years as president and CEO of CanWest Global Communications Corp.

Asper is one of the founders of Canterbury Park Capital, a private equity fund, and holds a significant interest in Creswin Properties, a real estate development company. He was a 2002 recipient of the "Top 40 Under 40," a business award recognizing achievement in Canada by individuals less than 40 years of age. Additionally, Asper was named "CEO of the Year" by Playback, a media industry publication for the Canadian television and film production community.

Asper served on the Board of Trustees of Brandeis University for five years, during which time he founded the Asper Center for Global Entrepreneurship atBrandeis International Business School. He currently serves on the board of overseers of Brandeis IBS. Asper also served for five years on the board of the University of Winnipeg Foundation and holds an honorary doctorate in laws from that institution.
 
Asper is the vice chair of the Asper Foundation and a member of the board of governors of the Saul and Claribel Simkin Center, a seniors' housing complex in Winnipeg.

Asper and his wife Susan founded the Joshua Foundation, which contributes to the arts, health care and general community services, primarily in Winnipeg. The Joshua Foundation also serves as the sponsor for the Joshua Project, which focuses on addressing inner city issues in Winnipeg, including refugees, victims of abuse, adult education, youth and recreation, and support for aboriginal services.

History

Canwest
Asper was the president and Chief Executive Officer of the Canadian media company, CanWest Global Communications Corp, a position he held for 10 years.

Asper began his career in 1991 as Associate General Counsel at Canada's leading private television network, Global. In 1994, Asper took over the role of corporate development for Canwest.

In this role, Asper was responsible for a number of acquisitions and launches, including, amongst others:

 La Red, a broadcast network in Santiago, Chile.
 TV3, Ireland's first and only private national television network.
 Radio Pacific, a publicly traded radio broadcaster in New Zealand, and Radio Otago.
 Fireworks Entertainment, a production and distribution company focused on syndicated content for international distribution. Fireworks distributed such programs as Andromeda and La Femme Nikita.

Asper also led several investigations into additional acquisitions in a variety of areas around the world, including South America and Eastern Europe.

In 1999, Asper became CEO of Canwest while leading the acquisition of Canada's third largest broadcaster, publicly traded WIC, in an $800 million transaction. Soon afterward, Canwest acquired most of the Hollinger newspapers in Canada in a $3.2 billion transaction.

During his tenure as CEO at Canwest, the company also expanded its international television operations further by launching TV4 in New Zealand as a sister station to its existing channel TV3. Canwest also acquired five radio stations in Turkey and the U.K., and formed Eye Corp., an outdoor advertising company operating in the U.S. and several countries in Australasia. Eye Corp. was formed by acquiring and integrating three separate out-of-home advertising companies based in Australia.

Recognizing that future expansion opportunities existed in the cable channel business, Canwest launched five digital cable channels in 2002, including Mystery, Men TV, Deja View, Fox Sportsworld and Xtreme Sports Network. In 2006, Asper negotiated a partnership with Goldman Sachs to acquire 13 cable/thematic channels owned by Alliance Atlantis, including Home & Garden TV, Food Network, History Channel, National Geographic, BBC Canada, BBC Kids, among others. The acquisition was valued at $2.3 billion, and also identified and implemented more than $50 million in synergies.

During Asper's tenure as CEO, Canwest grew to be Canada's largest media company, operating 20 television channels, including the national Global Television Network and 18 specialty channels. Canwest was also Canada's largest publisher of paid English-language daily newspapers and operated one of the largest digital portals in the country, Canada.com and its group of 80 associated websites.  Internationally, Canwest owned, operated and held substantial interests in TV, out-of-home advertising, websites, radio stations and networks in New Zealand, Australia, Turkey, Indonesia, Singapore, the U.K. and the U.S. Canwest's revenues nearly quadrupled between 1999 and 2008 to total $3.2 billion, while operating profit grew at annual rate of 8.5% between 1999 and 2008 to total $551 million.

Canwest also positioned itself at the forefront of the upcoming changes and integration in the media industry. Canwest received a number of awards for its success in creating sales and marketing groups that crossed platforms, media sectors and geographies. Canwest received the award as "Media Player of the Year" in 2007 from the leading Canadian marketing industry organization, and Canwest received the Broadcast Engineering Magazine's "Broadcast Engineering Excellence Award" from the U.S.-based National Association of Broadcasters (NAB) in 2009. The award recognized news studio technology for technical innovation, quality design and construction.

During the financial crisis that enveloped the global economy in 2008-2009, Canwest's debt load resulted in breaches of certain covenants in its loan documents and led to a filing under the Companies' Creditors Arrangement Act (CCAA) in September 2009. As part of that filing, the Asper family and bondholder group announced a plan whereby the Asper family would reinvest in a restructured company. Shaw Communications subsequently bid $2 billion for the broadcasting assets. The Canwest newspaper group was sold to a group led by GoldenTree Asset Management.

Asper stepped down as Canwest CEO on March 3, 2010 to participate in a competing bid in partnership with Goldman Sachs and Catalyst Partners, which was ultimately rejected by the court, paving the way for Shaw to acquire the broadcast assets.

In September 2010, Asper formed Sygnus Ventures, established to invest in and nurture digital media companies.

Anthem Sports & Entertainment Corp.
On December 8, 2010, Asper's Sygnus Corp. acquired a "significant ownership stake" in Anthem Sports & Entertainment, the parent company of Fight Network and several other sports-oriented specialty channels.

References

External links 
 The Asper Foundation

1964 births
Leonard
Living people
Canadian television executives
Canadian people of Ukrainian-Jewish descent
Brandeis University alumni
University of Toronto alumni
Lawyers in Manitoba
Canadian Jews
Global Television Network people
Canadian chief executives
Anthem Sports & Entertainment
Impact Wrestling executives